Basma Azouar (born 16 March 1983) is the Algerian Minister of Relations with Parliament. She was appointed as minister on 7 July 2021.

Education 
Azouar holds a Bachelor in Legal and Administrative Sciences, a Diploma of Advanced Studies and a Master in Human Rights.

References

External links 

 Ministry of Relations with Parliament

1983 births
Living people
21st-century Algerian politicians
Algerian politicians
Government ministers of Algeria